Eurodisco (also spelled as Euro disco) is the variety of European forms of electronic dance music that evolved from disco in the late 1970s, incorporating elements of pop and rock into a disco-like continuous dance atmosphere. Many Eurodisco compositions feature lyrics sung in English, although the singers often share a different mother tongue.

Eurodisco derivatives generally include Europop and Eurodance, with the most prominent sub-genres being space disco of the late 1970s and Italo disco of the early 1980s. The genre declined in popularity after 1986 in preference to electronic rock and hi-NRG, with a small revival of Italo disco in at least the late 1990s.

History
Eurodisco is largely an offshoot of contemporary American music trends going far back to the early times of R&B, soul, disco, pop and rock. During the 1960s, Europop hits spread around France, Italy and Germany, because of the French Scopitone (jukebox) and the Italian Cinebox/Coilorama Video-jukebox machines. Another root is the Eurovision Song Contest, especially in the 1970s.

The song "Waterloo" by Swedish pop group ABBA, which won the 1974 Eurovision song contest, is a typical example of a 1970s European pop song (Europop). The success was huge and European producers instantly produced pop hits, and a whole new commercial music industry in Europe was met in the demand for social dancing music. The discofox dancing style was a result of this.

The American music journalist Robert Christgau used the term "Eurodisco" in his late 1970s articles for The Village Voice newspaper.

The term "disco" in Europe existed long before the Eurodisco and U.S. disco music scene. It was used in Europe during the 1960s as a short alternative to "discotheque". The first dance music venues called discotheques emerged in Occupied France in the 1940s. In the UK, "discotheques" and "discos" were called "clubs" like any other nightclub. In Italy and Spain, the term "discoteca" or "discotheque" means mainstream clubs. In Greece, "discotheque" describes the retro-clubs.

An example of the term "disco" with no relation to a specific music style (and dance music in general), is the Disco series that aired in Germany on the ZDF network from 1971 to 1982. This show proved that the term "disco" was widespread enough at the time, and that the second national TV network of Germany used it for a general music TV show in 1971. Another later example is the show Discoring on Italy's RAI channel (first aired in February 1977).

1970s
The term "Euro-disco" was first used during the mid-1970s to describe the non-UK based disco productions and artists such as D.D. Sound, West Germany groups Arabesque, Boney M., Dschinghis Khan and Silver Convention, the Munich-based production trio Giorgio Moroder, Donna Summer and Pete Bellotte, the Italian singer Gino Soccio, French artists Amanda Lear, Dalida, Cerrone, Hot Blood, Banzai (single "Viva America") and Ottawan, Dutch groups Luv' and Eurovision song contest winners Teach-In. In Spain, disco took off after the death of Francisco Franco in 1975, with Baccara. Swedish group ABBA gained the big hit "Dancing Queen".

1970s Eurodisco soon had spinoffs and variations. The most notable spinoff is space disco, a crossover of Eurodisco and US hi-NRG disco. Another popular variation, with no specific name, appeared in the late 1970s: a "Latin"-like sound added to the genre, which can be heard in Italy's Raffaella Carrà, La Bionda (D. D. Sound), Easy Going and France's Gibson Brothers.

1980s
One of the early representatives of the 1980s genre was the British group Imagination and with their series of hits throughout 1981 and 1982. In the United States, Donna Summer was the only 1980s Eurodisco singer, and the term hi-NRG was used there instead.

1980s Eurodisco variations soon appeared later in France, Germany, Spain and Greece. The French and German Eurodisco productions were the most popular. German pop duo Modern Talking was an icon of Eurodisco between 1985–1987 and became the most successful Eurodisco project ever. Bad Boys Blue was another very successful project.

That style became very popular in Eastern Europe and remained popular until the early 1990s. In Poland, disco polo, a local music genre relying heavily on Eurodisco was developed at the verge of the '80s and '90s. Some Canadian disco productions by groups like Lime became hits.

1990s
During the late 1980s, Eurodisco hits were produced in Spain and Greece and much later in Poland and Russia. Meanwhile, a sped-up version of Eurodisco with dance-pop elements became successful in the US, under the term "hi-NRG". Even today for many Americans, "hi-NRG" means Paul Lekakis and the London Boys. Those hits (and a few others, like Londonbeat's "I've Been Thinking About You" from 1991) were the last hits called "Eurodisco" in Europe.

By the early 1990s, Eurodisco was influenced by the emergence of genres such as house, acid house and the electro (pop/dance/synth) music styles, and replaced (or evolved) by other music styles. Eurohouse and Italo-NRG are the most notable and connected directly with the Italo disco music scene. In the United States, especially for the Eurohouse style, they used the earlier term of "Eurodance" to describe this 1990s evolution of Eurodisco.

Technically speaking, the last form of Eurodisco is French house, a music style that appeared in France during the mid-1990s and slowly became widespread in Europe. French house is more of a "back to the roots" music style with 1970s Eurodisco influences far before the Italo disco explosion (more specifically space disco, hi-NRG disco, Canadian disco and P-funk).

2000s
By the mid to late 2000s, Eurodisco saw renewed interest. Artists such as Irene Cara, Berlin and the late Laura Branigan saw a surge in popularity, especially in places where it was not commercially successful after 1984, such as North America and South America. A notable Eurodisco artist to rise during this decade is Mark Ashley. His single "Give Me a Chance" became his most successful single yet, making the top 40 of the Austrian chart.

Influence in the United States
The influence of Eurodisco had infiltrated dance and pop in the U.S. by 1983, as European producers and songwriters inspired a new generation of American performers. While disco had been declared "dead" due to a backlash there in 1979, subsequent Euro-flavored successes crossing the boundaries of rock, pop and dance, such as "Call Me" by Blondie and "Gloria" by Laura Branigan, ushered in a new era of American-fronted dance music.

Branigan (produced by German producer Jack White) moved deeper into the Eurodisco style for further hits, alongside Giorgio Moroder-produced U.S. acts Berlin and Irene Cara. By 1984, musicians from many countries had begun to produce Eurodisco songs. In Germany, notable practitioners of the sound included Modern Talking, Arabesque, Sandra, Alphaville, C.C. Catch and Austrian Falco, although he was also heavily influenced by rap and rock music.

A Eurodisco revival was also contributed by northern European record labels such as Iventi D'azzurro (The Netherlands) and Flashback Records (Finland), with rearranged releases of the old hits and unreleased demos resung by the original Italo singers, also including new songs. Recording artists like Joey Mauro, Karl Otto, Diva have been releasing new albums. Joey Mauro was able to recreate the sound of 1980s Italo disco with his synthesizers and keyboard collections, and a special place within the scene is occupied by Peter Aresti, formerly known as Peter Arcade, who officially started his career in the '90s.

See also
 List of Eurodisco artists
 Eurodance
 Europop
 Italo disco
 Disco polo

References

External links
 Eurodisco in Brazil at energy-brazil.com.
 Eurodisco at euro-flash.net.
 Worldwide Euro-disco chart positions at scheul.de.

 
20th-century music genres
European music genres
Electronic dance music genres
Disco music genres
1980s in music